Rick Scott Christophel (born October 27, 1952) is an American football coach and former player. He is currently the senior offensive assistant for the Tampa Bay Buccaneers of the National Football League. In college, he was a quarterback for Austin Peay State University from 1971 to 1974.  He also previously served as head football coach at Austin Peay from 2007 to 2012, compiling a record of 20–46.

College career 
Christophel was the starting quarterback at Austin Peay from 1971 to 1974. After a year as a graduate assistant at his alma mater, he spent three seasons coaching at Highlands High School in Fort Thomas, Kentucky from 1976 to 1978.  He returned to Austin Peay as an assistant coach for three seasons (1979 to 1981), before making coaching stops at Southern Arkansas State (1982), Cincinnati (1983), Rice (1984 to 1985), and Vanderbilt (1986 to 1990). He then was an assistant coach at Mississippi State from 1991 to 1994, where he worked under Bruce Arians, who became the offensive coordinator there in 1993.. He then moved to the University of Alabama at Birmingham, where he spent 12 seasons, from 1995 to 2006, before returning to Austin Peay as head coach in 2007.

Head coaching record

National Football League coaching career

Arizona Cardinals
Christophel worked with the Arizona Cardinals from 2013 to 2017, serving as the team's tight ends coach under Arians' again. In 2017, he helped develop rookie free agent Ricky Seals-Jones a college wide receiver who he helped convert into a tight end. He briefly retired after that year.

Tampa Bay Buccaneers
In  Christophel again became a tight ends coach under Bruce Arians, this time with the Tampa Bay Buccaneers.

References

External links
 Rick Christophel at Pro Football Archives

1952 births
Living people
American football quarterbacks
Arizona Cardinals coaches
Austin Peay Governors football coaches
Austin Peay Governors football players
Cincinnati Bearcats football coaches
High school football coaches in Kentucky
Mississippi State Bulldogs football coaches
People from Reading, Ohio
Players of American football from Ohio
Rice Owls football coaches
Southern Arkansas Muleriders football coaches
UAB Blazers football coaches
Vanderbilt Commodores football coaches
Tampa Bay Buccaneers coaches